The black-capped vireo (Vireo atricapilla) is a small bird native to the United States and Mexico. It was listed as an endangered species in the United States in 1987.  Successful conservation efforts on the U.S. Army's Fort Hood and Fort Sill led to delisting the black-capped vireo in 2018. The IUCN lists the species as vulnerable.

Description
The black-capped vireo is a songbird about 12 cm (4.5 inches ) in length. Sexually mature males are olive green above and white below with faint yellow flanks. The crown and upper half of the head is black with a partial white eye ring and lores. The iris is brownish-red and the bill is black. Females are duller in color than males and have a slate-gray crown and underparts washed with greenish yellow. First-year males often have more extensive gray in the cap, similar to adult females.

Nesting
The male and female in a pair assist in nest construction and incubation. Typically, the female lays three or four eggs. The incubation period is 14 to 17 days, and the nestling period is 10 to 12 days. The female broods over the young, while the male supplies most of the food during the nestling phase. Breeding pairs are capable of producing more than one clutch per breeding season. The male cares for some or all of the fledglings, while the female nests again, sometimes with another male. These birds are insectivorous, with beetles and caterpillars making up a large part of their diet.

Black-capped vireos nest in "shinneries", brushy areas with scattered trees. Shinneries primarily consist of shin oak or sumac.  Appropriate height and density are important factors for this species' breeding success.  Foliage that extends to ground level is the most important requirement for nesting. Most nests are between 15 and 50 in (35–125 cm) above ground level, and are screened from view by foliage. Territories are sometimes located on steep slopes, where trees are often clumped and intermediate in height. On level terrain, the preferred black-capped vireo habitat is a mixture of shrubs and smaller trees that average from 8-10 ft high (2.5-3.5 m). Black-capped vireos stop using sites where many trees are nearing full size.

Distribution
The historic breeding distribution of the black-capped vireo extended south from south-central Kansas through central Oklahoma and Texas to central Coahuila, Mexico. At present, the range extends from Oklahoma south through the Edwards Plateau and Big Bend National Park, Texas, to at least the Sierra Madera in central Coahuila, Mexico. In Oklahoma, the black-capped vireo is found only in Blaine, Cleveland, Cotton and Comanche Counties. The winter range of this vireo is not well known. It is thought to winter along the west coast of Mexico from southern Sonora to Guerrero.

Conservation
The black-capped vireo is threatened by brown-headed cowbird (Molothrus ater) brood parasitism, human disturbance, and loss of habitat to urbanization, fire exclusion, grazing, and brush control.  With population sizes now well into the tens of thousands, the species continues to be managed by the Texas Parks and Wildlife Department and the Oklahoma Department of Conservation. Conservation efforts by the U.S. Army are continuing to enhance the conservation status of the black-capped vireo.

See also
Balcones Canyonlands National Wildlife Refuge

References

External links
U.S. Fish and Wildlife Service, Black-capped Vireo (Vireo atricapilla)
Black-capped Vireo photo gallery. Visual Resources for Ornithology, Drexel University
Black-capped Vireo video with song
BirdLife Species Factsheet.

black-capped vireo
Native birds of the Plains-Midwest (United States)
Birds of the Rio Grande valleys
Birds of Mexico
Endemic birds of Southwestern North America
black-capped vireo
black-capped vireo
ESA endangered species